The Personality Kid is a 1934 American drama film directed by Alan Crosland, starring Pat O'Brien and Glenda Farrell. The film was based on a story by Gene Towne and C. Graham Baker. It was released by Warner Bros. on July 7, 1934. A young prizefighter's success corrupts him and leads him to neglect his wife.

Plot
Joan McCarty (Glenda Farrell) is married to boxer Ritzy McCarty (Pat O'Brien), who has had some minor success, due to his active footwork in the ring and colorful personality. His crowd-pleasing technique catches the eyes of promoters Gavin (Robert Gleckler) and Stephens (Henry O'Neill). Under their management, Ritzy starts fighting in better venues and attracts the attention of Patricia Merrill (Claire Dodd). Patricia and Ritzy began an affair, which his wife Joan tolerates. When Ritzy learns that he has been winning because his opponents were paid to lose the fights, and that Joan agreed to these conditions, he leaves her.

Ritzy is suspended for fighting in a fixed fight. Patricia loses interest in him because he is no longer successful. He gets a job attracting customers to a health lecture. Patricia is there and invites him to visit her, but he finds a pregnant Joan waiting at Patricia's apartment. Ritzy, now determined to provide a good life for his child, accepts an offer to lose a fight. However, Ritzy puts up a good fight and knocks out his opponent after hearing that his wife has given birth to a boy. Impressed by the fight, Stephens visits him in the hospital and offers to put Ritzy back in the ring again, this time with legitimate fights.

Cast
 Pat O'Brien as Ritzy McCarty
 Glenda Farrell as Joan McCarty
 Claire Dodd as Patricia Merrill
 Robert Gleckler as Gavin
 Henry O'Neill as Stephens
 Thomas E. Jackson as Rankin
 Arthur Vinton as McPhail
 Clarence Muse as Shamrock
 Clay Clement as Duncan

Production
Pat O'Brien, who had boxed at Marquette University was trained for the movie by boxer Jackie Fields. In the film, Myron Schlecter, the boxing champion of the USS Arizona, and a former champion Mushy Callahan were O'Brien's opponents in the film. The film's pre-release title was "One Man Woman".

References

External links
 
 
 
 

1934 films
1930s sports drama films
Adultery in films
American black-and-white films
American sports drama films
American boxing films
Films directed by Alan Crosland
Warner Bros. films
1934 drama films
1930s English-language films
1930s American films